Takhellambam Deepak Singh (born 14 March 1997) is an Indian professional footballer who plays as a defender for I-League club Gokulam Kerala.

Career

TRAU
Singh started his career with I-League 2nd Division side TRAU in 2018.

NISA Manipur

NEROCA 
I-League side NEROCA FC have announced the signing of defender Takhellambam Deepak Singh on a two-year deal ahead of the 2020/21 season.

Gokulam Kerala FC
On 25 June 2021, it was announced that Singh signed for Gokulam Kerala in the I-League.

Career statistics

Honours
TRAU
 I-League 2nd Division: 2018–19

References

Living people
1997 births
People from Imphal
Footballers from Manipur
Indian footballers
Association football defenders
Gokulam Kerala FC players
TRAU FC players
I-League players